The Zeitschrift für anorganische und allgemeine Chemie (Journal of Inorganic and General Chemistry) is a semimonthly peer-reviewed scientific journal covering inorganic chemistry, published by Wiley-VCH. The editors-in-chief are Thomas F. Fässler, Christian Limberg, Guodong Qian, and David Scheschkewitz. Originally the journal was published in German, but nowadays it is completely in English.

Abstracting and indexing
The journal is abstracted and indexed in the following databases:

According to the Journal Citation Reports, the journal has a 2021 impact factor of 1.414, ranking it 40th out of 46 journals in the category "Chemistry, Inorganic & Nuclear".

References

External links

Chemistry journals
Wiley-VCH academic journals
English-language journals
Biweekly journals
Publications established in 1892